"Beast and the Harlot" is a song by Avenged Sevenfold, the song was released as a single taken from their third studio album City of Evil. The song peaked at #19 on the U.S. Mainstream Rock chart, #44 on the UK Singles Chart, and #1 on the UK Rock Chart on March 12, 2006.

Overview
The title of City of Evil is taken from a line in this song.

The song is one of the first songs recorded with singer M. Shadows' different vocal style avoiding unclean vocals as well as a more hard rock sound as opposed to their previous work, with heavy and fast riffs and a relatively normal song structure (with the exception of the guitar solo, which comes after the first chorus rather than the second, atypical of a three verse song).

The song's rapid main riff was voted as the 14th greatest riff ever by the guitar magazine Total Guitar in March 2007. Total Guitar wrote: "The main riff to Beast and the Harlot is a great piece of dropped-D riffing with Zacky and Synyster cleverly placing the second part of the riff across the beat to create an aggressive syncopated feel, once again avoiding all the usual metal clichés."

The cover art for the single of the song was done by Avenged Sevenfold's close friend Cam Rackam.

Live
"Beast and the Harlot" has been played 536 times by the band. It is their fourth most performed song live.
A live version recorded during Warped Tour was featured as the B-Side to Bat Country.

Meaning
"Beast and the Harlot is about the fall of Babylon, The Great from the Book of Revelation (particularly chapter seventeen), from which many quotes are taken, such as "Seven headed beast, ten horns raise from his head", "hatred strips her and leaves her naked", and other references. The Harlot referred to in the song is Great Babylon, quoted in the song, "Fallen now is Babylon The Great." On Avenged Sevenfold's All Excess DVD, Tony Petrossian, who directed the video, says that M. Shadows' lyrics for this song about the fall of Babylon is comparing Babylon to Hollywood, showing many Hollywood clichés such as the young, innocent boys being corrupted and losing their souls. In the music video the Harlot was played by actress Elizabeth Melendez.

Track listings

Other appearances
"Beast and the Harlot" has appeared on many other Avenged Sevenfold releases. A live version was featured as the B-Side to Bat Country, and also featured on Masters of Horror. The song was featured as the second track on their greatest hits album.

The song was featured in the soundtrack of the video games Burnout Revenge, Guitar Hero II, Guitar Hero Smash Hits, Rock Band 3, and Rocksmith. The version in Guitar Hero II was a cover version, while Smash Hits featured the master recording. The song was also featured in The Real World Road Rules reunion. The cover art for the single of the song was done by Avenged Sevenfold's close friend Cam Rackam. The Rock Band 3 version of the original master recording of the song being notable in that it has support for Rock Band PRO mode, which takes advantage of the use of a real guitar / bass guitar, along with standard MIDI-compatible electronic drum kits / keyboards in addition to up to three-part harmony and/or backing vocals.

Charts

Accolades

Personnel
Personnel listing as adapted from album liner notes.

Avenged Sevenfold
 M. Shadows – lead vocals, backing vocals
 Zacky Vengeance – rhythm guitar, co-lead guitar, backing vocals
 The Rev – drums, backing vocals
 Synyster Gates – lead guitar, piano, backing vocals
 Johnny Christ – bass, backing vocals

Production
Produced by Mudrock and Avenged Sevenfold, with additional production by Fred Archambault and Scott Gilman
Mixed by Andy Wallace
Pro Tools by John O'Mahony, assisted by Steve Sisco
Mastered by Eddie Schreyer
Additional vocal production by the Rev, Synyster Gates and M. Shadows
Orchestration by Scott Gilman, the Rev, Synyster Gates and M. Shadows
Drum tech – Mike Fasano
Guitar tech – Stephen Ferrara-Grand

Session musicians
Violinists – Samuel Fischer (soloist), Mark Robertson, Songa Lee-Kitto, Sam Formicola, Bruce Dukov, Alan Grunfeld, Larry Greenfield, Liane Mautner
Violists – David Walther, Matthew Funes, Alma Fernandez
Cellists – Victor Lawrence (soloist), David Low, David Mergen

Choir
Choir leader – Jeannine Wagner
Choir performers – Zachary Biggs, Colton Beyer-Johnson, Josiah Yiu, Nathan Cruz, Stephen Cruz, C.J. Cruz, Sean Sullivan, Alan Hong, Nico Walsh, Sally Stevens

References

2006 singles
2005 songs
Warner Records singles
Avenged Sevenfold songs
Power metal songs